The women's individual competition of the Golf events at the 2019 Pan American Games was held between August 8 and 11 at the Country Club Villa in Lima, Peru.

Amateur Emilia Migliaccio won the gold medal for the United States.

Schedule
All times are PET (UTC−5).

Results
The final results were:

(a) denotes an amateur

References

Golf at the 2019 Pan American Games